The 2014 Atlantic Coast Conference football season was the 62nd season of college football play for the Atlantic Coast Conference (ACC).  It was played from August 2014 to January 2015. 2014 was first season of play in the ACC for former American Athletic Conference member Louisville, which replaced ACC charter member Maryland after their move to the Big Ten Conference. Although the Notre Dame football program is not a member of the ACC, it has an agreement to play five ACC schools per season in football starting in 2014. This is in return for access to the non-College Football Playoff ACC bowl line-up. The Irish are not eligible for the ACC Championship Game.

The Atlantic Coast Conference consisted of 14 members in two divisions. The Atlantic Division consisted of Boston College, Clemson, Florida State, Louisville, North Carolina State, Syracuse, and Wake Forest. The Coastal Division consisted of Duke, Georgia Tech, Miami, North Carolina, Pittsburgh, Virginia, and Virginia Tech.  The division champions, Florida State and Georgia Tech, met in December in the 2014 ACC Championship Game, played in Charlotte, North Carolina at Bank of America Stadium.

Preseason

Preseason Poll
The 2014 ACC Preseason Poll was announced at the ACC Football Kickoff meetings in Greensboro, North Carolina on July 23. Miami was voted to win Coastal division while Florida State was voted to win the Atlantic division and the conference. Jameis Winston of Florida State was voted the Preseason ACC Player of the Year.

Atlantic Division poll
 Florida State – 780 (104 first place votes)
 Clemson – 660 (3)
 Louisville – 564
 Syracuse - 368
 North Carolina State – 326
 Boston College – 301
 Wake Forest – 136

Coastal Division poll
 Miami – 614 (26)
 Duke – 597 (33)
 Virginia Tech – 571 (23)
 North Carolina – 570 (27)
 Georgia Tech – 322 (1)
 Pittsburgh - 319 (2)
 Virginia – 142

Predicted ACC Championship Game Winner
 Florida State – 104
 Clemson – 2
 Virginia Tech - 2

Preseason ACC Player of the Year
 Jameis Winston, FSU - 99
 Vic Beasley, CLEM - 6
 Duke Johnson, MIA - 1
 Jamison Crowder, DU - 1
 Brenden Motley, VT - 1

Preseason All Conference Teams

Offense

Defense

Specialist

Coaches
The conference had two new head coaches for the 2014 football season.  Wake Forest hired Dave Clawson from Bowling Green one week after 13-year coach Jim Grobe resigned after his fifth straight losing season.  Wake Forest athletic director, Ron Wellman, stated that their preference was to hire someone with experience coaching a private school.  Clawson previously coached at FCS Fordham and Richmond before leading FBS Bowling Green to three bowl appearances and a conference title in the past five years. Louisville also changed coaches prior to the 2014 season.  Former head coach Charlie Strong left the Louisville program following the 2013 season to take the head coaching position at Texas.  Following his departure, Louisville rehired former head coach Bobby Petrino to a seven-year contract.  Petrino formerly coached Louisville from 2003-2006 before leaving to coach at Arkansas.  He spent his 2013 season as the head coach of Western Kentucky, where he led the team to an 8-4 record.

Note: Stats shown are before the beginning of the season

Rankings

Notre Dame partnership

Starting in 2014, Notre Dame is scheduled to play five games against ACC opponents annually. Each ACC team will play Notre Dame at least once during a three-year period.  Due to scheduling constraints however, the 2014 Notre Dame team will only play four ACC opponents, but will play six in 2015 to even out the schedule.

Bowl games

Bowl eligibility

Bowl eligible
Boston College
Clemson
Duke
Florida State
Georgia Tech
Louisville
Miami
NC State
North Carolina
Pittsburgh
Virginia Tech

Bowl ineligible
Syracuse
Wake Forest
Virginia

Bowl Results

Postseason

All-conference teams
The following players were selected to the All-ACC teams for 2014.

First Team

Second Team

Third Team

^ indicates that there was a tie in the voting

ACC Individual Awards

ACC Player of the Year
RB James Conner - Pittsburgh

Rookie of the Year
QB Brad Kaaya - Miami

Coach of the Year
Paul Johnson - Georgia Tech

Offensive Player of the Year
RB James Conner - Pittsburgh

Offensive Rookie of the Year
QB Brad Kaaya - Miami

Brian Piccolo Award
RB Duke Johnson - Miami

Jacobs Blocking Trophy
T Cameron Erving - Florida State

Defensive Player of the Year
DT Vic Beasley - Clemson

Defensive Rookie of the Year
S Quin Blanding - Virginia

Jim Tatum Award
LB David Helton - Duke

National Awards

John Mackey Award
TE Nick O'Leary- Florida State

Jim Thorpe Award
S Gerod Holliman- Louisville

Campbell Trophy
LB David Helton- Duke

References